Ida Schuster (28 September 1918 – 9 April 2020) was a Scottish theatre, radio and television actress, theatre director, and a leading figure in Glasgow's 20th-century Jewish theatre community.

Biography
One of nine children, her parents were Jewish immigrants who moved from Wilno, Poland (now Vilnius, Lithuania) to Glasgow at the end of the 19th century.  

Ida attended Abbotsford Primary School in the Gorbals.

Ida's older sister, Ray, married Avrom Greenbaum, who founded the Glasgow Jewish Institute Players, and her brother, Leon Schuster, was production manager for GJIP, and, later, when it merged with other groups, Glasgow Unity Theatre. 

Ida began acting at the age of 15, and was a prominent member of both theatre troupes.    Glasgow Unity Theatre, was, she said: “...a particular response to a particular time.  These were heady days and after the war we really felt utopia had arrived.”  She turned professional in the 1950s.

In 1973, she described her feelings about the artist within the community: Well...the bridge games, the social activities for charities which form so much of the pattern, must be partly rejected if one is to survive with any creative energy.  And as one grows older, responsibilities increase and energy decreases.  This happens to all of us and youth takes over.  Make no mistake, our young folk will be holding the reins with great expertise, well equipped for the battles which lie ahead.

Personal life
Ida was married to Dr. Allan Berkeley until his death in 1990, after 45 years of marriage.  At the time of his death, she was appearing in The Steamie and had to leave the cast. The couple had two children, Howard and Peter.  

Schuster died on 9 April 2020, at the age of 101.

Theatrical productions 
 The Dybbuk - first major role, as part of The Festival of Jewish Arts at Glasgow's McLellan Galleries, which responded to, and coincided with the Festival of Britain (4-25 February 1951)
 Blood Wedding (18-29 November 1952) - A GJIP production, with Schuster playing the role of The Mother
 Morning Star (1959) - GJIP's revival of the Sylvia Regan play
 Various productions as part of the Citizens' Theatre (season 1962-63):
 A Midsummer Night's Dream by William Shakespeare
 A Streetcar Named Desire by Tennessee Williams
 The Good Woman of Setzuan by Bertolt Brecht (première of new translation by John Willett)
 Uncle Vanya by Anton Chekhov
 Arms and the Man by George Bernard Shaw
 Saturmacnalia by Cliff Hanley
 Serjeant Musgrave's Dance by John Arden
 The Importance of Being Earnest by Oscar Wilde
 Henry IV by Luigi Pirandello
 The Partridge Dance by Ronald Mavor
 The Birthday Party by Harold Pinter
 The School for Scandal by Richard Brinsley Sheridan
 The Waltz of the Toreadors by Jean Anouilh
 V Minus One by John Hubbard
 A Resounding Tinkle by Norman Frederick Simpson
 The Love of Four Colonels by Peter Ustinov
 Strictly for the Birds (1966) - she was cited for her "standout performance".
 Dr. Angelus (1974) - played Angelus in the Pitlochry Festival Theatre production
 Blithe Spirit (1974) - played Madame Arcati in the Pitlochry Festival Theatre production
 Here for a father (1974) - played Medea in the Pitlochry Festival Theatre production
 Personal Effects (1974) - played Miss Anders in the Pitlochry Festival Theatre production
 The Slab Boys (premiered at the Traverse Theatre, 6 April 1978) - played Sadie, the tea lady 
 Country Life (1979) - Schuster noted for a strong performance of a "painted widow desperate for affection"
 Mary Stuart (1985) - played the role of Hannah, at the Glasgow Citizen's Theatre
 Lucy's Play (1986) - Noted for portraying a "delightfully wearisome mother"
 The Steamie (1987-1990) - Schuster played the role of Mrs. Culfeathers, acting alongside Elaine C. Smith, Dorothy Paul and Katy Murphy
 Daughters in Distress (1989) - Schuster was noted for a "tender, funny and uncommonly moving study"
 Musical Chairs (1993) - Schuster's performance noted as "worth an award in itself"

As director 
Amongst her work as a theatre director was the inaugural production (opening 12 May 1981) of Eine Kleine Nachmutze [Eine Kleine Nachtmusik] at the Tron Theatre.

Selected filmography
 Death Watch [La mort en direct](1980) - as Old Woman
 Passing Glory (1987) - Gillies MacKinnon's NFTS graduation film, also starring Fiona Chalmers and Alan Cumming
 A Short History of the Glasgow Jewish Institute Players (1996) - Schuster wrote and produced this video documentary
 A Shot at Glory (2000) - as Wee Brenda

Television appearances 
 One's Company (1974) - Co-starred with Robert Urquhart and Leena Skoog, broadcast on BBC Scotland
 Garnock Way (1976-1979) - as Carla the café owner
 The Dunroamin' Rising (1988) - Play by Colin MacDonald
 And the Cow Jumped Over the Moon (1991) - Play by Donna Franceschild broadcast on BBC1
 Doctor Finlay (1993) 
 Taggart (1990-2005) - as various characters 
 River City (2002) - as Lily Fraser

'Old School' podcast 
In 2020, Ida was described as "the world’s oldest podcaster", in reference to her recording of Old School (for broadcaster Janice Forsyth’s Big Light company), in which she shared stories about her life and career.

References

External links
 

1918 births
2020 deaths
Actresses from Glasgow
Scottish stage actresses
Scottish film actresses
Scottish centenarians
Scottish Jews
Women centenarians
20th-century Scottish actresses
21st-century Scottish actresses